Torpedo Stadium (Belarusian: Стадыён «Тарпеда», Stadyjon Tarpeda; Russian: Стадион «Торпедо») is a multi-purpose stadium in Zhodino, Belarus. It is currently used mostly for football matches and is the home ground of Torpedo-BelAZ Zhodino. The stadium was opened in 1969, renovated in 2011, and currently holds 6,524 people.

The stadium hosted an international friendly between Belarus and Honduras on 24 March 2021.

References

External links

Stadium profile at Torpedo-BelAZ website
Stadium profile at pressball.by

Football venues in Belarus
Zhodzina